Mara Bâtea (born 12 April 1995) is a Romanian women's football midfielder, currently playing for Olimpia Cluj. She has been a member of the Romanian national team since 2012.

Honours 
Olimpia Cluj
Winner
 Romanian Superliga (3): 2011–12, 2012–13, 2013–14, 2014–15, 2015–16, 2016–17, 2017–18
 Romanian Women's Cup: 2013–14, 2014–15, 2016–17

External links 
 

1995 births
Living people
Sportspeople from Cluj-Napoca
Romanian women's footballers
Romania women's international footballers
Women's association football midfielders
FCU Olimpia Cluj players